Miss International Queen Vietnam (Vietnamese: Hoa hậu Chuyển giới Việt Nam) is a beauty pageant in Vietnam for transgender women. The top three placers from each season have the opportunity to participate in Miss International Queen.

The current Miss International Queen Vietnam titleholder is Phùng Trương Trân Đài from California. She will represent Vietnam in Miss International Queen 2021.

History
On the evening of March 30, 2018, Nguyễn Hương Giang held a party to thank everyone for their support during her participation in the Miss International Queen 2018 contest. Accordingly, after the negotiation and working process, she became the copyright owner of Miss Universe Tiffany in Vietnam and the national director of the Miss International Queen Vietnam contest. The contest will take place with the aim of finding the representative of Vietnam in the Miss International Queen.

The first season called Perfect Conquest - The Tiffany Vietnam was broadcast as a reality show on YouTube 's VIVA Show channel from December 14, 2018. To January 11, 2019, the joint night The final was held with the victory belonging to Do Nhat Ha from Ho Chi Minh City.

2 years later, the show was held for the second season on a larger scale with a team of experienced coaches including Nguyễn Minh Tú (Top 10 Miss Supranational 2018 ), Hoàng Thùy (Top 20 Miss Universe 2019), Nguyễn Hà Kiều Loan (Top 10 Miss Grand International 2019) and judges Võ Hoàng Yến,... The finale took place on January 16, 2021. Finding the highest position is Phùng Trương Trân Đài from California, United States.

Title holders

Ranking by region

Winner

Miss International Queen 
 Color key

See also 

 Miss Universe Vietnam
 Miss World Vietnam
 Miss Earth Vietnam
 Miss Grand Vietnam
 Miss Supranational Vietnam
 Miss Vietnamese World
 Mister Vietnam
 Vietnam at major beauty pageants

References

External links

Beauty pageants in Vietnam
Vietnamese awards
Miss International Queen Vietnam